Rebecca Sjöwall is an American opera singer and recording artist.

Biography
Born in Wisconsin, Sjöwall has a B.A. in Political Science from Luther College and a Master's Degree in Vocal Performance from UCLA She is a two-time District Winner in the Metropolitan Opera National Council Auditions and was a Studio Artist with Arizona Opera from 2010-2012.

Career
In 2007, Sjöwall won the American Jenny Lind competition sponsored by the Barnum Festival and in cooperation with the Royal Swedish Academy of Music, which led to a concert tour of Sweden. In 2008, she made her professional debut as Micaëla in a West Bay Opera staging of Carmen. She has since appeared with Arizona Opera, Nashville Opera, Opera Idaho, San Francisco Lyric Opera, Festival Opera of Walnut Creek, Pacific Opera Project, and the Sacramento Philharmonic and Opera.

She has performed a variety of roles, including Violetta in La traviata, Contessa Almaviva in The Marriage of Figaro, Pamina in The Magic Flute, Gilda in Rigoletto, Liù in Turandot, the Governess in The Turn of the Screw, Mrs. P in The Man Who Mistook His Wife for a Hat, and Older Alyce in Glory Denied. She also created the role of Anna Roosevelt Boettiger in the world premiere performances of The First Lady, an opera depicting the days following Franklin D. Roosevelt's death and most recently created the role of Professor Elyn Saks in the world premiere of The Center Cannot Hold, based on the book of the same title.

Naxos released a studio recording of Michael Nyman's The Man Who Mistook His Wife for a Hat, featuring Sjöwall, Matthew Treviño, and Ryan MacPherson with Dean Williamson conducting the Nashville Opera Orchestra on September 9, 2016. The album was recorded at Ocean Way Nashville, located in the heart of Nashville's Music Row.

In 2019, Sjöwall performed the world premiere of a new musical work for soprano, narrator, and piano entitled Mother's Word. Through monologue and song, Mother's Word focuses on the untold stories of mothers from the Bible, including Eve, Hagar, Sarah, Rebekah, Leah, Naomi, Ruth, Bathsheba, Elizabeth, and Mary, with text written by Marian Partee and music by Christina Whitten Thomas. The premiere took place at La Cañada Presbyterian Church and featured Sjöwall with pianist Aiko Fukushima and director/narrator Tina Tong.

Sjöwall is also an active recording artist and member of The Recording Academy. She is the singer of the "Rapture Anthem" on the popular video game BioShock and has collaborated on several projects with Sparks.

In 2009, Sjöwall was part of the singing cast for the radio musical The Seduction of Ingmar Bergman by Sparks, which premiered on Sveriges Radio and was later released on vinyl and CD. Andy Gill in The Independent gave The Seduction of Ingmar Bergman a maximum rating of 5 stars and included the record among his 20 albums of the year. The world premiere of the live musical took place on June 25, 2011, at the John Anson Ford Amphitheatre in Hollywood. It was hosted by the Los Angeles Film Festival and starred Sparks, Guy Maddin, Peter Franzén as Bergman, Tammy Glover recreating her role as the Hollywood Welcoming Committee, Sjöwall reprising her role as the Hollywood starlet, and Ann Magnuson as Greta Garbo.

Sjöwall appears on the final track of Sparks' album Hippopotamus, which was released by BMG Records on September 8, 2017, and entered the U.K. Album Charts at No. 7.

In the 2021 film Annette, featuring story and music by Sparks, Sjöwall portrays the voice of Connie O'Connor. The film was directed by Leos Carax and stars Adam Driver, Marion Cotillard, and Simon Helberg. Sjöwall is also credited with additional voices in the film and on the Cannes Edition (Selections from the Motion Picture) Soundtrack.

Also in 2021, Sjöwall is the featured score vocalist in Barb and Star Go to Vista Del Mar, a film starring Kristen Wiig, Annie Mumolo, and Jamie Dornan. The score was written by Christopher Lennertz and Dara Taylor.

Reception
Of Sjöwall's appearance as Micaëla (Carmen), the San Francisco Classical Voice wrote, "she lit up the proceedings with glowing, sweet tone and a radiant persona, which rightfully reaped some of the longest applause of the evening." Her 2009 performance as Gilda in Rigoletto was judged to show "real promise" with an "impressive high E-flat". In addition, her performance in Turandot was lauded as a "lovely and limpid Liù" that was "deeply affecting."

After her role debut with Nashville Opera as Mrs. P in Michael Nyman's The Man Who Mistook His Wife for a Hat, ArtsNash declared, "Her climactic singing scream of 'Philistine!' at Dr. S is one of the most electrifying moments I've experienced in more than 40 years of attending live opera and theater performances."

As Older Alyce in Tom Cipullo's Glory Denied with Nashville Opera, "We are lucky to have a singer with so clear a vocal affinity to new music as Rebecca Sjöwall. Her voice just takes to it so easily, I forget she’s singing. That's not just because of her several patter passages in Glory Denied, but the natural ease in her vocal precision and her voice' richness give a relatable life to the character. She made me feel for Alyce in a way that the set-up of the narrative discourages." - Tracy Monaghan, Schmopera

Roles

 Alice Ford in Verdi's Falstaff
 Amore	in Gluck's Orfeo ed Euridice
 Anna Roosevelt in Kenneth Wells' The First Lady (world premiere)
 Contessa Almaviva in Mozart's Le nozze di Figaro
 Edith in Gilbert and Sullivan's The Pirates of Penzance
 Micaëla and Frasquita in Bizet's Carmen
 Gilda in Verdi's Rigoletto
 Governess in Britten's The Turn of the Screw
 Gretel in Humperdinck's Hänsel und Gretel
 Helena in Britten's A Midsummer Night's Dream
 High Priestess in Verdi's Aida
 Inez in Verdi's Il trovatore
 Kate Pinkerton in Puccini's Madama Butterfly
 La Marchesa in Verdi's Un giorno di regno
 Liù in Puccini's Turandot
 Lucy in Menotti's The Telephone
 Lucy Brown in Weill's The Threepenny Opera
 Marguerite in Auber's Manon Lescaut
 Mimì in Puccini's La bohème
 Mrs. P in Michael Nyman's The Man Who Mistook His Wife for a Hat
 Older Alyce in Tom Cipullo's Glory Denied
 Pamina in Mozart's Die Zauberflöte
 Professor Elyn Saks in Kenneth Wells' The Center Cannot Hold (world premiere)
 Rosalinde in Strauss' Die Fledermaus
 Violetta in Verdi's La traviata
 Williamson girl in David Lang's the difficulty of crossing a field

Discography
 Mrs. P - Michael Nyman's The Man Who Mistook His Wife for a Hat (Naxos)
 Hollywood Starlet - The Seduction of Ingmar Bergman by Sparks
 Guest Artist - Hippopotamus by Sparks
 Featured Score Vocalist - Barb and Star Go to Vista Del Mar (Original Motion Picture Soundtrack)
 Connie O'Connor & Additional Voices - Annette (Cannes Edition - Selections from the Motion Picture Soundtrack)

References

External links
Official website

American operatic sopranos
Living people
Year of birth missing (living people)
Luther College (Iowa) alumni
UCLA School of the Arts and Architecture alumni
21st-century American women opera singers
Singers from Wisconsin
Classical musicians from Wisconsin